The 1978 NCAA men's volleyball tournament was the ninth annual tournament to determine the national champion of NCAA men's college volleyball. The tournament was played at St. John Arena in Columbus, Ohio during May 1978.

Pepperdine defeated UCLA in the final match,  3–2 (15–12, 11–15, 15–8, 5–15, 15–12), to win their first national title. Coached by Marv Dunphy, the Waves finished the season 21–4.

Pepperdine's Mike Blanchard was named Most Outstanding Player of the tournament. An All-tournament team of seven players was also named.

Qualification
Until the creation of the NCAA Men's Division III Volleyball Championship in 2012, there was only a single national championship for men's volleyball. As such, all NCAA men's volleyball programs (whether from Division I, Division II, or Division III) were eligible. A total of 4 teams were invited to contest this championship.

Tournament bracket 
Site: St. John Arena, Columbus, Ohio

All tournament team 
Mike Blanchard, Pepperdine (Most outstanding player)
Ron Wilde, Pepperdine
Jay Anderson, Pepperdine
Dave Olbright, UCLA
Sinjin Smith, UCLA
Steve Salmons, UCLA
Aldis Berzins, Ohio State

See also 
 NCAA Men's National Collegiate Volleyball Championship

References

1978
NCAA Men's Volleyball Championship
NCAA Men's Volleyball Championship
1978 in sports in Ohio
May 1978 sports events in the United States
Volleyball in Ohio